is a Japanese video game development company. The company is a result of a merger between BEC and Banpresoft by their parent company, Bandai Namco Entertainment.

History

, short for Bandai Entertainment Company, was a joint venture by Bandai and Human for video game development. They were best known for developing licensed video games for Bandai including Digimon, Dragon Ball Z and Mobile Suit Gundam. 

Bandai eventually took full control of BEC, after Human went bankrupt in 2000, and once Bandai and Namco merged to create Bandai Namco Holdings, BEC became a video game development subsidiary for the merged company.

 was a subsidiary of Banpresto that developed video games.

On April 1, 2011, Bandai Namco merged BEC with Banpresoft in order to streamline and unify the Bandai gaming subsidiaries under one division, whilst the Banpresto brand was re-established as a toy company as part of Bandai Namco's toys and hobby business. B.B. Studio continued to use the Banpresto name on its products until February 2014, when it was decided that all Bandai Namco video games going forward would only carry the Bandai Namco name.

List of games

Notes

References

External links
  
 Former Banpresoft website
 Former BEC website

Software companies based in Tokyo
Bandai Namco Holdings subsidiaries
Video game companies established in 1994
Video game companies of Japan
Video game development companies
Japanese companies established in 1994